Tregarrick R. Taylor is an American attorney and politician serving as the Alaska attorney general. He assumed office in an acting capacity January 30, 2021, succeeding Ed Sniffen, who resigned after being appointed to the position two weeks before.

Education 
Taylor attended the United States Air Force Academy and then earned a Bachelor of Arts degree in political science from Brigham Young University and a Juris Doctor from the J. Reuben Clark Law School at BYU.

Career 
In 2016, Taylor was an unsuccessful candidate for a seat in the Anchorage Municipal Assembly. Taylor has served as the deputy attorney general of Alaska for the civil division. Taylor assumed office as Alaska attorney general in an acting capacity January 30, 2021. He was confirmed to the position by the Alaska Legislature on May 11, 2021.

Taylor supported the Pebble Mine proposal and expressed opposition to the federal government's decision to block the project.

He has threatened legal action against Walgreens over the potential distribution of abortion pills in Alaska, even though abortion and the relevant medications remain legal in Alaska.

Personal life 
Taylor and his wife, Jodi, have six children and live in Anchorage.

References 

Alaska Attorneys General
Alaska lawyers
Brigham Young University alumni
J. Reuben Clark Law School alumni
Living people
Year of birth missing (living people)
Alaska Republicans